Rouge Croix Pursuivant of Arms in Ordinary is a junior officer of arms of the College of Arms. He is said to be the oldest of the four pursuivants in ordinary. The office is named after St George's Cross which has been a symbol of England since the time of the Crusades.

The current Rouge Croix Pursuivant of Arms in Ordinary is Thomas Andrew Johnston.

Holders of the office

See also
 Heraldry
 Officer of Arms

Further reading
 The College of Arms, Queen Victoria Street : being the sixteenth and final monograph of the London Survey Committee, Walter H. Godfrey, assisted by Sir Anthony Wagner, with a complete list of the officers of arms, prepared by H. Stanford London, (London, 1963)
 A History of the College of Arms &c, Mark Noble, (London, 1804)

References

External links
The College of Arms
CUHGS Officer of Arms Index

Offices of the College of Arms